Sir Robert Dashwood, 1st Baronet (1662–1734) was an English politician.

Life
The son of George Dashwood, a London merchant, and Margaret Perry, he was a first cousin of Sir Samuel Dashwood and Sir Francis Dashwood, 1st Baronet (the fortunes of the two branches of the family went back to George Dashwood's grandfather, Robert Dashwood of Stogumber in Somerset, who died in 1610). He was educated at Eton College and Trinity College, Oxford, and created a baronet on 16 September 1684.

Dashwood was a Tory and strong Anglican; and a courtier under James II. Despite these views, he became involved in the matter of Edmund Prideaux, implicated in Monmouth's Rebellion in 1685. (There was a family connection, Prideaux being the brother of his mother-in-law Margaret.) Giving and lending money, Dashwood enabled Prideaux to pay off the accusation. As the 1690s proceeded, he became identified with the Country Party opposition.

Family
On 9 June 1683 Dashwood married Penelope, daughter of Sir Thomas Chamberlayne, 2nd Baronet. They had five sons and four daughters.

Their eldest son surviving to adulthood was Robert, who married Dorothea Read(e). The next son Richard married a cousin, Elizabeth Lewis (as a granddaughter of Sir Samuel Dashwood, a second cousin once removed). The third daughter Catherine married Sir Banks Jenkinson, 4th Baronet.

The other daughters were Margaret (who died young), and Anne who married Anthony Cope (he was son of Jonathan Cope and brother of Sir Jonathan Cope, 1st Baronet, both MPs). Robert the son died in 1728, in Paris, before his father. His son became Sir James Dashwood, 2nd Baronet in 1734.

Notes

1662 births
1734 deaths
People educated at Eton College
Alumni of Trinity College, Oxford
English MPs 1689–1690
English MPs 1690–1695
English MPs 1695–1698
English MPs 1698–1700
Baronets in the Baronetage of England